Voronino is a rural locality (a village) in Velikodvorskoye Rural Settlement, Totemsky District, Vologda Oblast, Russia. The population was 42 as of 2002.

Geography 
Voronino is located 49 km south of Totma (the district's administrative centre) by road. Knyazhikha is the nearest rural locality.

References 

Rural localities in Totemsky District